Wang Chunlu (born 27 September 1978 in Changchun, China) is a Chinese short track speed skater. She won medals in the 500 m and 3000 m relay at the 2002 Winter Olympics. She had also already won a relay silver medal at the 1998 Winter Olympics, at the age of 19.

Her strongest event by far was always the 500 metres, where she won 3 world titles- 1995, 1998, and 2001.   In addition to her Olympic bronze in 2002, she was also leading the final and on her way to a likely gold medal in 1998 before a dangerous and poorly executed passing attempt by Isabelle Charest unfortunately led to Charest and Wang both falling.   Distraught Wang, despite not being injured, refused to complete her 5 laps, and ceded the bronze medal to Chun Lee Kyung, the winner of the B final.  Her strong start and strength on high speed corners are what made the 500 metres Wang's strongest event.

Surprisingly her best major meet performance was at the 1995 World Championships at only 16, where as a relative newcomer she won gold in the 500 meters and 1000 metres, and a bronze in the 1500 metres.  Despite this she was narrowly defeated for the Overall points title by Chun Lee Kyung, taking silver overall.   She also won silver overall at the 2001 World Championships, and a bronze overall at the 1998 World Championships.   She competed in what is perhaps still to this day the strongest era ever in Chinese short track speed skating from 94-2002 due to its depth of established stars such as Wang, both Yang Yang's (the one born in 1976 and the one born in 1977), Zhang Yanmei, and Li Yan.

References

External links
 Database Olympics

1978 births
Living people
Chinese female speed skaters
Chinese female short track speed skaters
Olympic short track speed skaters of China
Olympic silver medalists for China
Olympic bronze medalists for China
Olympic medalists in short track speed skating
Short track speed skaters at the 1998 Winter Olympics
Short track speed skaters at the 2002 Winter Olympics
Medalists at the 1998 Winter Olympics
Medalists at the 2002 Winter Olympics
Asian Games medalists in short track speed skating
Short track speed skaters at the 1996 Asian Winter Games
Short track speed skaters at the 1999 Asian Winter Games
Short track speed skaters at the 2003 Asian Winter Games
Speed skaters from Changchun
Medalists at the 1996 Asian Winter Games
Medalists at the 1999 Asian Winter Games
Asian Games gold medalists for China
Asian Games silver medalists for China
Universiade medalists in short track speed skating
Universiade gold medalists for China
Competitors at the 1997 Winter Universiade